RWF may refer to:

 Rainer Werner Fassbinder, German film director
 Rassemblement Wallonie-France, a minor Belgian political party
 Royal Welch Fusiliers, a British Army regiment
 Rwandan franc, in ISO 4217 code, a currency
 Royal Agricultural Winter Fair, Toronto, often abbreviated to Royal Winter Fair 
 Republic of West Florida, a short-lived republic
 Rail Wheel Factory, Bangalore, India
 San José–Santa Clara Regional Wastewater Facility, a wastewater treatment plant in San Jose, California